Michele Lega S.T.D. J.U.D. (1 January 1860 – 16 December 1935) was a Cardinal of the Roman Catholic Church who served as Prefect of the Congregation for the Discipline of Sacraments.

Early life and priesthood
Michele Lega was born on 1 January 1860 in Brisighella, Italy. He was educated at the Seminary of Faenza and the Pontifical Roman Athenaeum S. Apollinare, where he earned doctorates in theology, philosophy and a doctorate utriusque iuris (in both canon and civil law in 1888.

He was ordained on 13 September 1883 in the diocese of Faenza. He served as a faculty member of the Pontifical Urbanian Athenaeum "De Propaganda Fide" in Rome from 1887 until 1889. He then held the position of professor of philosophy until 1890 as well as being assistant professor of canon law from 1888 to 1889. He was a faculty member of the Pontifical Roman Athenaeum S. Apollinare from 1889 to 1893. He was made Privy Chamberlain on 11 August 1897. He was a member of the Pontifical Commission for the Codification of Canon Law and thus helped edit the 1917 Code of Canon Law. He was the Dean of the Roman Rota from 1908 until 1914.

Cardinalate 
He was created and proclaimed Cardinal-Deacon of Sant'Eustachio in the consistory of 25 May 1914. He was one of the cardinal electors in the conclave of 1914 that elected Pope Benedict XV. He was appointed Prefect of the Congregation for Discipline of Sacraments on 20 March 1920. He also participated in the conclave of 1922 that elected Pope Pius XI. After ten years as a cardinal-deacon he opted for the order of cardinal priests and his deaconry was elevated pro hac vice to title in 1924.

Episcopate
He opted for the order of cardinal bishops and the suburbicarian see of Frascati on 21 June 1926. He was consecrated on 11 July of that year in the Sistine Chapel by Pope Pius XI. The cardinal's brother, Antonio Lega, archbishop of Ravenna and the bishop of Cervia, attended the ceremony.

Death 
He died in 1935. The funeral took place on 20 December, in the basilica of Ss. XII Apostoli, Rome.

References

External links
 
Catholic Hierarchy 

1860 births
1935 deaths
20th-century Italian cardinals
Cardinal-bishops of Frascati
Members of the Congregation for the Discipline of the Sacraments
Prefects of the Apostolic Signatura
Cardinals created by Pope Pius X
People from the Province of Ravenna